The 1987–88 IHF Women's Cup Winners' Cup was the twelfth edition of IHF's competition for European women's handball national cup champions. It was contested by 22 teams, two more than the previous edition.

Defending champion Kuban Krasnodar again won the competition, beating 1982 European Cup champion Vasas Budapest in the final.
 Kuban was the second team to successfully defend the title.

Results

References

Women's EHF Cup Winners' Cup
1987 in handball
1988 in handball